Kopri, primarily a residential colony, is situated on the east side of Thane railway station, Maharashtra, India.

References

Neighbourhoods in Thane
Cities and towns in Thane district